Thomas J. Galvin (December 30, 1932 – February 18, 2004) was an American librarian and academic. Galvin held a bachelor's degree in English from Columbia University and a master’s in library science from Simmons College as well as a doctorate from Case Western Reserve University. From 1962 to 1972, he held a series of combined faculty and leadership positions at the Graduate School of Library and Information Science at Simmons College, ultimately being named Associate Dean and Professor. He was then made Dean of the School of Library and Information Science at the University of Pittsburgh from 1974 to 1985.

Galvin served as president of the American Library Association from 1979 to 1980 and as its Executive Director from 1985 to 1989.

Galvin became Director of the Library at the University at Albany in 1989. He was also a professor in the School of Information Science and Policy where he implemented a doctoral program. He retired in 1999 and was made Professor Emeritus by the faculty.

Awards and honors
 ALISE Award for Professional Contributions to Library and Information Sciences Education (1993)
 Medical Library Association’s Eliot Prize for the most significant contribution to the literature of medical librarianship (1988)
 Best information science book of the year by the American Society for Information Science (1979).

References

 

1933 births
2004 deaths
American librarians
Presidents of the American Library Association
Columbia College (New York) alumni
Case Western Reserve University alumni
Simmons University alumni